The Ulakhan-Kyuegyulyur (Ulaxan Küögülüür) is a river in Sakha Republic (Yakutia), Russia. It is one of the major tributaries of the Omoloy.

The river flows north of the Arctic Circle, across desolate tundra territories of the East Siberian Lowland. Its basin falls within Ust-Yansky District.

Course
The Ulakhan-Kyuegyulyur is the largest right tributary of the Omoloy. It has its sources in the western slopes of the Kular Range of the Verkhoyansk Range system. The river flows roughly in a NNE direction flanking the feet of the range. After it descends into the East Siberian Lowland, it heads in a northern direction until the end of its course. The river flows roughly parallel to the Omoloy further west, meandering in the floodplain. Finally the Ulakhan-Kyuegyulyur joins the right bank of the Omoloy  from its mouth.

Tributaries
The river is frozen between mid October and early June.

See also
List of rivers of Russia

References

External links 
Fishing & Tourism in Yakutia
Omoloy Protected Area

Tributaries of the Omoloy
Rivers of the Sakha Republic
Verkhoyansk Range
East Siberian Lowland